Marie-Thérèse of Spain may refer to:

 Maria Theresa of Spain (1638-1683), Queen of France
 Infanta Maria Teresa Rafaela of Spain (1726-1746), Dauphine of France